Khan Ahmed Shuvo is a Bangladesh Awami League politician and a Jatiya Sangsad member representing the Tangail-7 constituency. He has won the by-elections in Tangail (Mirzapur) constituency that held on 16 January 2022.

Career 
Shuvo was elected to parliament from Tangail-7 as an Awami League candidate. Shuvo received 104,059 votes while his closest rival, Jatiya Party candidate Jahirul Islam Jahir, received 16,773 votes. On 22 January 2022 he took his oath as a member of Parliament at the Jatiya Sangsad Bhaban which was administered by Speaker Shirin Sharmin Chaudhury.

Shuvo is the Director of Federation of Bangladesh Chambers of Commerce & Industries. Shuvo is an executive editor of local newspaper Daily Ajker Deshbashi published from Tangail. He is executive member of Tangail District Awami League.

Personal life 
Shuvo's father Fazlur Rahman Faruque is the veteran politician who is the current President of Tangail District unit of the Awami league and incumbent District council administrator.

References 

Awami League politicians
Living people
11th Jatiya Sangsad members
Year of birth missing (living people)
People from Tangail District